Our Song may refer to:

Film, television and theatre
 Our Song (film), a 2000 American film by Jim McKay
 "Our Song" (Webster), a 1987 TV episode
 Our Song, a 1988 play by Keith Waterhouse
 HaShir Shelanu (lit. Our Song), an Israeli musical telenovela

Songs
 "Our Song" (Anne-Marie and Niall Horan song), 2021
 "Our Song" (Goodnight Nurse song), 2006
 "Our Song" (Taylor Swift song), 2006
 "Our Song" (Yes song), 1983
 "Our Song", by M2M from Shades of Purple, 2000
 "Our Song", by Matchbox Twenty from North, 2012
 "Our Song", by Plain White T's from Wonders of the Younger, 2010
 "Our Song", by Ron Geesin and Roger Waters from Music from The Body, 1970
 "Our Song", by the Spill Canvas, 2010
 "Our Song", by the xx from Coexist, 2012

See also
 "Our Songs", a song by Buono